Esporte Clube São Luiz, commonly known as São Luiz, is a Brazilian professional association football club based in Ijuí, Rio Grande do Sul. The team plays in Série D, the fourth tier of the Brazilian football league system, as well as in the Gauchão Série A, the top tier of the Rio Grande do Sul state football league.

Current squad

Achievements

 Campeonato Gaúcho Second Level:
 Winners (4): 1975, 1990, 2005 and 2017.
 Copa FGF:
 Winners (1): 2022

References

External links
 

 
Association football clubs established in 1938
Football clubs in Rio Grande do Sul
1938 establishments in Brazil